Mbamba Bay is a town in western Tanzania, lying on the eastern shore of Lake Malawi/Lake Nyasa.

Port 

Mbamba Bay has an indentation in the otherwise straight profile of the lake and may be a potential port.

Transport 

In October 2007, it was proposed to build a branch railway from Liganga via Mchuchuma to Mbamba Bay. Mbamba Bay is linked with Nkhata Bay in Malawi by motorized dhow.
The A19 links it with Mtwara, Tanzania, on the east coast.

See also 

 Transport in Tanzania
 Mtwara Development Corridor

References

External links 

Populated places in Ruvuma Region
Lake Malawi
Malawi–Tanzania border crossings